The Grove Play is an annual theatrical production written, produced and performed by and for Bohemian Club members, and staged outdoors in California at the Bohemian Grove each summer.

In 1878, the Bohemian Club of San Francisco first took to the woods for a summer celebration that they called midsummer High Jinks. Poems were recited, songs were sung, and dramatic readings were given. In 1881, the ceremony of the Cremation of Care was first conducted after the various individual performances. Eventually, the readings and songs were woven into a theme or framework, such as in the solemn Orientalism-themed Buddha Jinks of 1892 and the Christianity-triumphs-over-paganism-themed Druid Jinks the next year. In 1897, the Faust Jinks were constructed within the musical form of Charles Gounod's opera Faust. Finally, in 1902, both the music and the libretto were composed by club members, setting the "Bohemian grove-play as a distinct genre of stage art."

Each year a Sire and a musical Sire are selected by the club's Jinks Committee, part of the club's Board of Directors. The Sire is responsible for producing the script and libretto of the Grove Play, and the musical Sire composes the music. The Sire may select others to write the dialog and song lyrics, but remains responsible for the overall theme and final form of the spectacle.

In the earliest productions of the Grove Play, several restrictions were imposed upon the Sire including that the stage setting be the natural forest backdrop and that the "malign character Care" be introduced in the plot, to wreak havoc with the characters and then be faced down and vanquished by the hero. In these early productions, the Cremation of Care immediately followed, and lasted until midnight. The end of the ceremony was signaled by a lively Jinks Band rendition of There'll Be a Hot Time in the Old Town Tonight, and the club members sat down to a late dinner and revelry into the wee hours.

From 1913, the Cremation of Care was disengaged from the Grove Play, and rescheduled for the first night of the summer encampment. The Grove Play was set for the final weekend. A different Sire was appointed for the Cremation, and some concerns were raised in subsequent years that the Cremation of Care was growing into its own secondary Grove Play. Some Sires experimented with a satirical treatment, or topical themes such as a patriotic World War I treatment in 1918 and an unpopular Prohibition script in 1919. "Care" was not killed, let alone cremated, in the 1922 version. In response to member complaints about the unpredictable quality of the opening night fare, Charles K. Field was asked in 1923 to write the script for what became the basis for every subsequent Cremation of Care ceremony.

From 1902 to 1923, a central theme of most Grove Plays was the mystique of the ancient Coast Redwood tree grove. Jack London wrote The Acorn Planter: A California Forest Play for the High Jinks but it was never staged; it was described as too difficult to set to music. Beginning around 1920 with the installation of a large Austin pipe organ, the productions became more professional in tone. In 1922, a sophisticated lighting system was installed at the Main Stage, the venue for the Grove Play. During the World War II years 1943–1945, no Grove Plays were staged.

Unusual performances include the 1906 production of The Owl and Care, which is listed in Grove's dictionary as "Not strictly a Grove-Play." The Triumph of Bohemia was already planned, but the 1906 San Francisco earthquake changed the club's priorities in favor of a more elaborate cremation ceremony called The Owl and Care. Two plays have been staged twice for the club members: St. Patrick at Tara in 1909 and 1934, and A Gest of Robin Hood in 1929 and 1954. 1912's The Atonement of Pan was performed once for club members and again two weeks later for members' wives and women friends. In 2008, the treatment of The Count of Monte Cristo was staged even though it had been published four years prior.

The cast for a Grove Play averages 75–100 actors, many appearing as so-called "spear carriers" in crowd scenes. Roles for female characters are played by men, since women are not allowed as members of the Bohemian Club. Including orchestra members, costumers, stage crew and carpenters, some 300 people are involved with the production each year. The cost of each play was reported in the range of $20,000–30,000 in 1975, as much as $,000 in current value. No salaries are given to club members who take part and no admission is charged the audience. Rehearsals begin a year in advance.

Observers have characterized the Grove Plays as massive, predictable and slow. Author John van der Zee has described the Grove Plays as "lumbering pageants." Commenting on the plot, he said, "We know in advance that the hero will be a king or commander adored by his men, and that he will see his duty and do it." Journalist Philip Weiss, writing in 1989 for Spy magazine, said that the high point of the two-week summer encampment was the "vigorously lowbrow" Low Jinks, a musical comedy staged during the middle weekend, not the "mannered and ponderous Grove Play." Journalism professor Richard Reinhardt argued in 1980 that the showy bombast of Broadway theatre producer David Belasco helped form in the early Grove Plays a taste for majestic and astounding visual effects, and that this aesthetic sense has continued to the present in a form of "institutional inertia."

References
Notes

Bibliography
Bohemian Club. History, officers and committees, incorporation, constitution, by-laws and rules, former officers, members, in memoriam, 1960
Bohemian Club. History, officers and committees, incorporation, constitution, by-laws and rules, former officers, members, in memoriam, 1962
Domhoff, G. William. Bohemian Grove and Other Retreats: A Study in Ruling-Class Cohesiveness, Harper & Row, 1975. 
Garnett, Porter, The Bohemian Jinks: A Treatise, 1908

Scheffauer, Herman George; Arthur Weiss; Bohemian Club. The Sons of Baldur, Bohemian Club, 1908.
Stephens, Henry Morse; Wallace Arthur Sabin, Charles Caldwell Dobie, Bohemian Club. St. Patrick at Tara, 1909 Grove play
Wilson, Harry Leon; Domenico Brescia; Bohemian Club. Life, Bohemian Club, 1919.
Bohemian Club. The annals of the Bohemian Club / comprising text and pictures furnished by its own members. v.5, 1972

Plays

Lists of plays
San Francisco Bay Area-related lists